Cardiofitness is a 2007 romantic comedy film directed by Fabio Tagliavia and starring Nicoletta Romanoff. It is based on a novel with the same name by Alessandra Montrucchio.

Plot

Cast 

Nicoletta Romanoff as Stefania
 Federico Costantini as   Stefano
Giulia Bevilacqua as  Cecilia
Sarah Felberbaum as  Ilaria
 Daniele De Angelis as  Guido  
 Fabio Troiano as  Maurizio 
Dino Abbrescia as  Nick 
 Nina Torresi as  Cinzia
 Manuela Kustermann as Stefania's Mother
 Gianni Carretta Pontone as Carlo
 Gisella Burinato as  Moira
 Stefano Sardo as  Jean-Claude
Giorgio Colangeli as The General

See also 
 List of Italian films of 2007

References

External links 

2007 romantic comedy films
Italian romantic comedy films
2007 directorial debut films
2007 films
2000s Italian films